Osówek  (German Ossoweg) is a village in the administrative district of Gmina Osieczna, within Starogard County, Pomeranian Voivodeship, in northern Poland.

For details of the history of the region, see History of Pomerania.

The village has a population of 410.

People born in Osówek
 Bolesław Piechowski (1885-1943) Roman Catholic priest, kashubian activist, murdered by the German-Nazis in Hartheim.
 Franciszek Ossowicki (1912-1944) murdered by the German-Nazis in Stutthof.

References

Villages in Starogard County